Frank Reamer Schell (October 22, 1884 – December 5, 1959) was an American rower who competed in the 1904 Summer Olympics. In 1904, he was part of the American boat, which won the gold medal in the eights.

References

External links
 
 
 

1884 births
1959 deaths
American male rowers
Rowers at the 1904 Summer Olympics
Olympic gold medalists for the United States in rowing
Medalists at the 1904 Summer Olympics